As of November 2022, BH Air serves the following scheduled destinations.

Destinations

References 

Lists of airline destinations